Koyil Puraa is a 1981 Indian Tamil-language film directed by K. Vijayan for R. M. C. Creations. The film stars Shankar and Saritha. It was released on 30 July 1981.

Plot

Cast 
Shankar
Saritha
P. U. C. Raja Bahadur
Vinu Chakravarthy

Soundtrack 
The soundtrack was composed by Ilaiyaraaja while the lyrics were written by Pulamaipithan. The song "Vedham Nee" is set in the Carnatic raga known as Gaula. Charulatha Mani identifies "Amuthe Tamizhe" as being set in Poorvikalyani, although Carnatic musicologist Sundararaman claims it is set in Rasika Ranjani, a raga he identifies "Sangeethame" as being set in, although Charulatha Mani says it is in Rasikapriya. This was the final film where the nadaswaram-playing brothers M. P. N. Sethuraman and Ponnuswamy performed.

References

Bibliography

External links 
 

1980s Tamil-language films
1981 films
Films directed by K. Vijayan
Films scored by Ilaiyaraaja